Jake Waterman (born 6 May 1998) is a professional Australian rules footballer playing for the West Coast Eagles in the Australian Football League (AFL). Jake is the son of dual AFL Premiership defender Chris Waterman. He was drafted by West Coast with their final selection and seventy-seventh overall in the 2016 national draft as a father-son selection. In round 6, 2018, Waterman was nominated for the AFL Rising Star after recording fourteen disposals, five marks and two goals in the eight point win against  at Optus Stadium.

Statistics
 Statistics are correct to the end of round 8, 2022

|- style="background-color: #EAEAEA"
! scope="row" style="text-align:center" | 2018
|
| 45 || 16 || 13 || 12 || 118 || 60 || 178 || 75 || 23 || 0.8 || 0.8 || 7.4 || 3.8 || 11.1 || 4.7 || 1.4
|-
! scope="row" style="text-align:center" | 2019
|
| 2 || 13 || 15 || 5 || 112 || 45 || 157 || 75 || 16 || 1.2 || 0.4 || 8.6 || 3.5 || 12.1 || 5.8 || 1.2
|- style="background-color: #EAEAEA"
! scope="row" style="text-align:center" | 2020
|
| 2 || 10 || 9 || 2 || 78 || 25 || 103 || 51 || 8 || 0.9 || 0.2 || 7.8 || 2.5 || 10.3 || 5.1 || 0.8
|-
! scope="row" style="text-align:center" | 2021
|
| 2 || 14 || 13 || 8 || 129 || 44 || 173 || 89 || 27 || 0.9 || 0.6 || 9.2 || 3.1 || 12.4 || 6.4 || 1.9
|- style="background-color: #EAEAEA"
! scope="row" style="text-align:center" | 2022
|
| 2 || 7 || 2 || 3 || 39 || 15 || 54 || 25 || 13 || 0.3 || 0.4 || 5.6 || 2.1 || 7.7 || 3.6 || 1.9
|- class="sortbottom"
! colspan=3| Career
! 60
! 52
! 30
! 476
! 189
! 665
! 315
! 87
! 0.9
! 0.5
! 7.9
! 3.2
! 11.1
! 5.3
! 1.5
|}

Notes

References

Jake Waterman is also related to the Essendon Bombers Alec Waterman.

External links

1998 births
Living people
West Coast Eagles players
Claremont Football Club players
Australian rules footballers from Western Australia
West Coast Eagles (WAFL) players
East Perth Football Club players